Vettanur  is a village in the  
Arandhangi TK  Pudukkottai district, Tamil Nadu, India.

Demographics 

As per the 2010 census, Vettanur had a total population of 1790 with 1025 males and 988 females. Out of the total population 2
113 people were literate.

References

Villages in Pudukkottai district